The 1955 VPI Gobblers football team represented the Virginia Polytechnic Institute in the 1955 college football season.

Schedule

Players
The following players were members of the 1955 football team according to the roster published in the 1956 edition of The Bugle, the Virginia Tech yearbook.

References

VPI
Virginia Tech Hokies football seasons
VPI Gobblers football